KTVB (channel 7) is a television station in Boise, Idaho, United States, affiliated with NBC and owned by Tegna Inc. The station's studios are located on West Fairview Avenue (off I-184) in Boise, and its transmitter is located on Dear Point in unincorporated Boise County.

The station also operates a low-power repeater in Twin Falls, KTFT-LD (channel 7). The two signals are identical, with the exception of commercials, which are sold and targeted to the Magic Valley area. KTFT maintains a small advertising sales office on Falls Avenue in Twin Falls and transmitter on Flat Top Butte near Jerome, Idaho. Master control and most internal operations are based at KTVB's facilities.

History 
The station, Idaho's oldest (but not its first), signed on July 12, 1953, as KIDO-TV. Along with radio station KIDO, it was originally owned by Georgia Davidson, who was one of only three female station owners in the NBC network including Dorothy Bullitt of future sister station KING-TV in Seattle. Davidson sold KIDO radio in 1959 but kept KIDO-TV, which she renamed KTVB on February 1.

KTVB has always been a primary NBC affiliate, owing to KIDO radio's longtime relationship with the NBC Radio Network. After KBOI-TV (channel 2, CBS) signed on in November 1953, the two stations briefly shared secondary DuMont affiliations, and shared secondary ABC affiliations until KITC (channel 6) signed on in 1974. Before PBS member KAID-TV (channel 4) signed on in December 1971, KTVB preempted the second hour of the Today Show to carry Sesame Street without commercials on weekday mornings.

In the early 1960s, KTVB built a satellite station in La Grande, Oregon. KTVR-TV (channel 13) went on the air December 6, 1964, as a semi-satellite of KTVB, but had a La Grande studio at 1605 Adams Ave., producing a nightly newscast and other local programming. However, by 1967, the La Grande studio and office had been closed and KTVR was a total satellite of KTVB. KTVR was unique in the Pacific Time Zone because as a repeater of a Mountain Time Zone station, its "prime time" schedule was broadcast from 6 to 9 p.m. PT, two hours early. OEPBS (now Oregon Public Broadcasting) bought KTVR on August 31, 1976, and converted it to a non-commercial PBS member station on February 1, 1977.

Philo Farnsworth, the father of television and a native of Beaver, Utah, was present as the station signed on the air. During KTVB's fiftieth year celebration in 2003, the tag line "the first television station in the state where TV was invented" was used in some promotional announcements.

In 1979, KTVB was sold to the Bullitts' King Broadcasting Company, joining company flagship station KING-TV in Seattle, KREM-TV in Spokane, and KGW-TV in Portland, as part of King Broadcasting. In 1992, the company was sold to the Providence Journal Company, which was later sold to Belo Corp. in 1997.

KTVB has branched out into non-traditional areas, such as its free "Idaho Classifieds" project on the ZIdaho website. KTVB is no longer affiliated with ZIdaho as of January 2013. In August 2011, KTVB became the first station in Boise to broadcast its entire weekday schedule in high definition.

On June 13, 2013, the Gannett Company announced that it would acquire Belo. The sale was completed on December 23. On September 24, 2014, KTVB announced that they would switch to the Gannett graphics package and "This is Home" music package on September 28, 2014.

The station's multicast channels, Idaho's Very Own 24/7 and NWCN, were moved to the basic plan on Cable One system on August 27, 2013. Northwest Cable News was replaced with the Justice Network on subchannel 7.3 on January 20, 2015. NWCN would shut down almost two years later, on January 6, 2017.

On June 29, 2015, the Gannett Company split in two, with one side specializing in print media and the other side specializing in broadcast and digital media. KTVB was retained by the latter company, named Tegna.

KTVB-DT2
KTVB-DT2, branded on-air as Idaho's Very Own 24/7, is the second digital subchannel of KTVB, programmed as an independent station. Over the air, it broadcasts on channel 7.2 in Boise and on KTFT-LD 7.2 in Twin Falls.

History

At the end of October 2003, KTVB launched 24/7 NewsChannel on KTVB-DT2, one of the first digital secondary subchannels in the nation. The subchannel's programming initially consisted of time-shifted newscasts plus five other programs not on its main channel. Plans for the independent news format subchannel were for original news programs and other local programming.

By fall 2011, the station had rebranded its 24/7 NewsChannel as "Idaho's Very Own 24/7" while revamping the 6:30 p.m. newscast and the morning news at 7 a.m. added additional features.

Though originally billed as a 24-hour news channel, the subchannel has become more of an independent station in order to compete with other subchannels in the area which carry other outside subchannel networks, along with adding traditional syndicated programming, especially with KTRV-TV's September 2016 decision to convert to a full-time Ion Television affiliate (and eventual purchase by Ion itself), which freed up several programs for the local market (another factor is KTVB's newscasts being available live or delayed on its website, making the subchannel's original purpose superfluous).

Programming
KTVB-DT2 simulcasts the main station's morning and 5 p.m. newscasts on Mondays through Saturdays, as well as the weekend early evening (Saturdays at 5 p.m. and 6 p.m.) and weekend 10 p.m. newscasts. Airing the weekend early evening newscasts allows viewers to still see a newscast despite NBC Sports preempting newscasts for college football or NBC Sunday Night Football coverage during the fall, and golf and NASCAR coverage in those seasons. Exclusive to the station is a weekday 7 a.m. hour-long newscast, and Friday Night Flights on Friday evenings, which provides coverage of local high school football. In other non-prime slots, repeats of the last KTVB newscast produced before that time period are seen. KTVB-DT2 also broadcasts Boise State University athletic contests—including football and basketball—along with shows like Inside Bronco Football on Wednesday nights and the Idaho Coaches Show on Thursday nights. Both programs are shown at 10:30 p.m. and repeated the following day at 12:30 p.m.

Syndicated programming on KTVB-DT2 includes The Wendy Williams Show, Just for Laughs Gags, Impractical Jokers and The Dr. Oz Show, along with second runs of KTVB's syndicated programming such as Judge Judy. In rare cases where KTVB must preempt NBC network programming for local breaking news or community interest coverage, KTVB-DT2 carries network shows in their regularly scheduled timeslots.

News operation
KTVB produces 6½ hours of original news programming each weekday distributed between KTVB and KTVB-DT2, and a total of 38 hours of original news and sports programming per week.

Former reporters have gone on to attain national prominence, including Christi Paul of CNN Headline News, Trace Gallagher of Fox News, David Kerley of ABC News and Meg Oliver of CBS News' Up To The Minute.

The KTVB news gathering fleet includes a new state of the art satellite truck purchased in 2006, allowing for live coverage of events across the region. KTVB's resources also include two live units, 10 news gathering vehicles, and a digital production truck.

The station has won a total of seven National Edward R. Murrow awards from the Radio Television Digital News Association (RTDNA). KTVB is also the recipient of numerous Emmy Awards from the National Academy of Television Arts and Sciences, Northwest Chapter. On September 30, 2013, KTVB added the area's second weekday hour-long 4:00 p.m. newscast (after KBOI-TV).

Notable former-on air staff
Eric Johnson – weekend sports anchor (1984–1986). Currently weeknight anchor for KOMO 4 in Seattle.

Technical information

Subchannels
The stations' digital signals are multiplexed:

Analog-to-digital conversion 
KTVB shut down its analog signal, over VHF channel 7, on June 12, 2009, the official date in which full-power television stations in the United States transitioned from analog to digital broadcasts under federal mandate. The station's digital signal relocated from its pre-transition UHF channel 26 to VHF channel 7 for post-transition operations.

Translators

See also 

Circle 7 logo
KTVB-DT2
Northwest Cable News

References

External links 

NBC network affiliates
True Crime Network affiliates
Quest (American TV network) affiliates
Twist (TV network) affiliates
Rewind TV affiliates
Tegna Inc.
Television channels and stations established in 1953
1953 establishments in Idaho
TVB
24-hour television news channels in the United States
Former Gannett subsidiaries